Effusibacillus is a genus of Gram-positive, rod-shaped, aerobic, spore-forming bacteria.

Effusibacillus was first proposed in 2014 after a strain of bacteria was isolated from the sediment of a freshwater lake. While genetically similar to other members of the family Alicyclobacillaceae, the strain was found to be distinct enough to require its own genus, and was named E. lacus. It was also found that two other previously described organisms in the genus Alicyclobacillus, A. consociatus and A. pohliae belonged in this new genus. The name is derived from Latin effusus (disorderly) and bacillus (small rod), which refers to the various lengths of the cells microscopically.

Members of this genus have been isolated from a lake in Japan, a lake in Antarctica, and from the blood of a woman (in a non-infectious capacity). E. lacus and E. pohliae are both thermophiles, with optimum growth temperatures above 50 °C, while the optimum growth temperature for E. consociatus is 30 °C.

Phylogeny
The currently accepted taxonomy is based on the List of Prokaryotic names with Standing in Nomenclature (LPSN) and National Center for Biotechnology Information (NCBI)

See also
 List of bacterial orders
 List of bacteria genera

References

Bacillales
Bacteria genera